Sir Henry Paulet St John, 2nd Baronet (1737–1784), was a British politician who sat in the House of Commons from  1772 to 1780.

Early life
St John was the eldest son of Sir Paulet St John, 1st Baronet, MP. of Dogmersfield Park, Hampshire and his wife Mary Waters, daughter of John Waters of Brecon. In 1750 he was at Winchester College. He entered New College, Oxford on 15 October 1755 and was awarded MA on 5 July 1759. At the age of 23, he was knighted on 24 December 1760. He married Dorothy Maria Tucker, daughter of Abraham Tucker of Betchworth Castle Surrey on 27 October 1763.

Political career
With the backing of the Duke of Chandos, St. John was returned unopposed as Member of Parliament for Hampshire at a by-election in February 1772. In the 1774 general election he retained the seat. He is not recorded as speaking in the House and he did not stand in 1780.

Later life and legacy
St John  succeeded his father in the baronetcy and the Dogmersfield Park estate on 9 June 1780 and died on 7 August 1784.  He was succeeded by his only son Henry. He and his wife Dorothy also had two daughters.

References

1737 births
1784 deaths
People from Hart District
People educated at Winchester College
Alumni of New College, Oxford
Members of the Parliament of Great Britain for English constituencies
British MPs 1768–1774
British MPs 1774–1780
Baronets in the Baronetage of Great Britain